Kaźmierzewo may refer to the following places:
Kaźmierzewo, Nakło County in Kuyavian-Pomeranian Voivodeship (north-central Poland)
Kaźmierzewo, Włocławek County in Kuyavian-Pomeranian Voivodeship (north-central Poland)
Kaźmierzewo, West Pomeranian Voivodeship (north-west Poland)